Hornbill TV is a 24-hour news television channel headquartered at Pure Entertainment Group in Chümoukedima, Nagaland, India. It is the first satellite TV channel in Nagaland. The channel is ​run by Pure Entertainment Group and broadcasts news in English and Nagamese, current affair programme and talk shows.

Hornbill TV also publishes contents through its official social media sites such as Facebook, Instagram, Twitter and YouTube.

History
Hornbill TV was first conceptualized in 2019. The channel was soft launched on January 29, 2021.

References

External links
 
 Hornbill TV on Instagram
 Hornbill TV on YouTube

 
Television channels and stations established in 2021
Television channels in Nagaland
2021 establishments in Nagaland